Piovà Massaia is a comune (municipality) in the Province of Asti in the Italian region Piedmont, located about  east of Turin and about  northwest of Asti.

Piovà Massaia borders the following municipalities: Capriglio, Cerreto d'Asti, Cocconato, Cunico, Montafia, Montiglio Monferrato, Passerano Marmorito, and Piea.

References

Cities and towns in Piedmont